Jim Doyle (born October 28, 1943) is a politician in British Columbia, Canada. 
Doyle held public office for 30 years; five years as a councillor; fifteen as Golden’s Mayor, and ten years as a Member of the Legislative Assembly and Cabinet Minister. Doyle is Golden’s longest serving Mayor.

Early life
Doyle was born in County Down, Ireland. His passion for politics was sparked while working in Brisbane, Australia before emigrating to Canada in 1967.

Local government
Doyle was elected as a municipal councillor in Golden in 1976 and subsequently re-elected in 1978 and 1980. He went on to serve as mayor from 1981 to 1990.

Legislative Assembly
Following a 24-year career with the Canadian Pacific Railway Doyle was elected to the legislative assembly for the New Democratic Party in 1991 for the riding of Columbia River-Revelstoke. He was subsequently re-elected in 1996 and, during his second term as an MLA, held various offices within the provincial government, first as Parliamentary Secretary to the Minister of Municipal Affairs. With the exception of a short period between February and November 2000 when Doyle was Minister of Forests he served as Minister of Municipal Affairs from July 1999 until nearly the full caucus defeat of the party less two members in the election of May 2001.

Subsequent career
The 2001 legislative election saw all but two of incumbent NDP's candidates, including Doyle, defeated. In 2002 he successfully campaigned for election as Mayor of Golden. In October 2007, Doyle left the NDP and joined the BC Liberal Party. Doyle stepped down as Mayor in December 2008 and was followed by councillor Aman Virk.

References

External links
 Biography at the British Columbia Legislative Assembly 

1943 births
British Columbia municipal councillors
British Columbia New Democratic Party MLAs
Canadian Pacific Railway people
Irish emigrants to Canada
Living people
Mayors of places in British Columbia
Members of the Executive Council of British Columbia
People from the Columbia-Shuswap Regional District
People from County Down
20th-century Canadian politicians
21st-century Canadian politicians